Andrei Mațiura (born 4 October 1981) is a Moldovan football coach and a former midfielder. He is an assistant coach with Russian club Sochi.

Playing career
Mațiura has played for FC Olimpia, FC Hîncești, Nistru Otaci, Terek Grozny, Metallurg-Kuzbass Novokuznetsk  and Dynamo Saint Petersburg. He has also made 3 appearances for the Moldova national team.

References

External links
 

1981 births
Sportspeople from Bălți
Living people
Moldovan footballers
Moldova international footballers
Association football midfielders

CSF Bălți players
CS Petrocub Hîncești players
FC Nistru Otaci players
FC Akhmat Grozny players
FC Novokuznetsk players
FC Dynamo Saint Petersburg players
Moldovan Super Liga players
Russian First League players
Russian Second League players
Moldovan expatriate footballers
Expatriate footballers in Russia
Moldovan expatriate sportspeople in Russia
Moldovan football managers
Moldovan expatriate sportspeople in Kazakhstan
Moldovan expatriate sportspeople in Iran